Jemo may be:
Jemo Island, of the Marshall Islands, an island in the Pacific Ocean
Jemo is also a soil type on tropical islands and atolls, characterized by raw humus overlying phosphatic hardpan. It originates from leaching of guano.